The grey-winged blackbird (Turdus boulboul) is a species of bird in the thrush family.

It is found in south-eastern Asia from the Himalayas to northern Vietnam. Its natural habitat is subtropical or tropical moist montane forests.

References

grey-winged blackbird
Birds of the Himalayas
Birds of Myanmar
Birds of Laos
Birds of Vietnam
Birds of Yunnan
grey-winged blackbird
Taxonomy articles created by Polbot